Caninus was an American deathgrind band formed as a side project by Most Precious Blood guitarist Justin Brannan, Rachel Rosen, drummer Colin Thundercurry and two female pitbull terriers, Budgie and Basil. They were signed to War Torn Records and had three releases, including a split with Hatebeak and a 7" split with death metal band Cattle Decapitation. In 2008,  Richard Christy played the drums on an unknown number of songs for Caninus.

On January 5, 2011, Basil, one of Caninus's pitbulls, died. Basil had been diagnosed with a brain tumor and was euthanized. The band has ended because of the dog's death. Vocalist Budgie also died in early 2016.

Past members
Basil – vocals
Budgie – vocals
Buddy Bronson – bass
Justin Brannan – guitar
Rachel Rosen – guitar
Richard Christy – drums
Blast Thundercurry (Colin Kercz) – drums
Rocky Raccoon – drums
Thunder Hammer Attack – drums
L. Ron Howard – drums

Discography
Now the Animals Have a Voice, album (2004)
Caninus/Hatebeak, split (2005)
Cattle Decapitation/Caninus, split (2005)

See also 
 Hatebeak
 Zoomusicology

References

External links
Official band website

Zoomusicology
Deathgrind musical groups
American grindcore musical groups
Musical groups established in 1992
Musical groups disestablished in 2011